Uranophora quadrimaculata is a moth in the subfamily Arctiinae. It was described by Heinrich Benno Möschler in 1872. It is found in Suriname and French Guiana.

References

Moths described in 1872
Euchromiina